The 2009 Copa Petrobras Santiago was a professional tennis tournament played on outdoor red clay courts. It was part of the 2009 ATP Challenger Tour. It took place in Santiago, Chile between 19 and 25 October 2009.

ATP entrants

Seeds

 Rankings are as of October 12, 2009.

Other entrants
The following players received wildcards into the singles main draw:
  Guillermo Hormazábal
  Fernando Romboli
  Cristóbal Saavedra-Corvalán
  Mariano Zabaleta

The following players received entry from the qualifying draw:
  Diego Cristín
  Adrián García
  Mariano Puerta
  Marco Trungelliti

Retirements
  Santiago Ventura (retired due to abdominal pain)

Champions

Singles

 Eduardo Schwank def.  Nicolás Massú, 6–2, 6–2

Doubles

 Diego Cristín /  Eduardo Schwank def.  Juan Pablo Brzezicki /  David Marrero, 6–4, 7–5

External links
Copa Petrobras de Tênis official website
ITF Search 
2009 Draws

Copa Petrobras Santiago
Clay court tennis tournaments
Copa Petrobras Santiago
Copa